Rugby Club CERN - Meyrin - St Genis (RC CMSG) are a semi-professional Swiss rugby union club situated on the French–Swiss border,  northwest of Geneva. The club plays in the Swiss first division where it is one of the most successful teams in the country's history, behind Hermance RRC.

Club history
RC CMSG was formed as Rugby Club du CERN (Rugby Club of CERN) in 1965, making it the oldest club currently playing in Switzerland. The earliest recorded match in Switzerland was in 1869 and if they were still in existence, Lausanne RFC could have claimed to be as old as Blackheath. The club was originally formed by staff of CERN (European Organization for Nuclear Research) in around 1960, playing against other companies and organizations in the Geneva area. In 1970, RC CERN organised a memorial competition, Challenge Laurent Membrez, in honor of Laurent Membrez, the founder of Albaladejo Rugby Club. This led to the creation of the Swiss Rugby Federation in 1972 with the then president of RC CERN, André Cordaillat, becoming the federation's first president. In 1984, the club moved to its present ground just across the border in Saint-Genis-Pouilly, France; despite being officially renamed to Rugby Club CERN - St Genis, it was still referred to as RC CERN. Then in 2003 the club merged with the successful Ecole de rugby Meyrin (Meyrin Rugby School), creating the present Rugby Club CERN - Meyrin - St Genis with two stadiums, one in France and one in Switzerland. In 2005, the Wildcats, RC CMSG's women's rugby team, were created, adding to the growth of women's rugby in Switzerland.

After the creation of the Swiss Federation, the club enjoyed considerable success, winning both the Swiss Championship and Swiss Cup repeatedly. In the early 1990s, the fortunes of the club started to change and their successes became less frequent, with the club eventually being relegated to the second division in 1994. The club regained promotion a couple of years later but were only to remain in the first division for a further two years. After a dispute between players, coaches and management, the president removed the club from all competitions. In the autumn of 2000, a new management took control of the club, bringing in ex-England B, Ireland A, Northampton and Gloucester second row, John Etheridge, as coach. The club then won the third and second divisions in consecutive years, but were unable to stay in the first division, and after the second relegation from the first division, Etheridge left the club. In 2007, RC CMSG appointed Claude Ezoua as head coach, who notably took the Ivory Coast rugby team to the 1995 Rugby World Cup. The club then achieved promotion back to the first division in the 2008–2009 season, losing only one game in the whole season, with the club managing to stay in the first division during the 2009–2010 season for the first time in 15 years. RC CMSG slowly climbed to the top of table, each season finishing higher than the previous, and making the league knock-out stages for three consecutive seasons. In 2014 CERN re-enforced the coaching setup with the ex-Romanian national squad captain Ioan Doja who represented his country at the World Cup, also playing teams such as for Oyonnax.

The January 2015 General Assembly voted in new club president Grégory Bertrand, long time member of the club. Due to a number of players leaving the club, the management asked the Swiss Federation for the club to be relegated to the second division for the 2015/2016 season after 6 years in the first division. The 2015/2016 season saw CERN undefeated at home and following the league play off matches they were promoted back to the first division after only one season in the second division.

Club honours

Current 1st team Squad

Presidents

Coaches

Men

Women (Wildcats)

See also
Rugby union in Switzerland
Swiss Rugby Federation
Nyon Rugby Club
Stade Lausanne Rugby Club

References

Meyrin
CERN